SP-427  is a state highway in the state of São Paulo, Brazil. It begins in São José do Rio Preto and ends in Mirassolândia, in a length of 25 km.

References

Highways in São Paulo (state)